Kemerovo International Airport , also known as Alexei Leonov Airport, is one of 2 major airports in Kemerovo Oblast area, Russia, Southwestern Siberia located 10 km southeast of Kemerovo. It is a civilian airfield serving medium-sized airliners, but large enough to be used for military purposes.

Gallery

Airlines and destinations

Statistics

Annual Traffic
Annual Passenger Traffic

See also
 
 Alexei Leonov, namesake and cosmonaut, first person to walk in space

References

External links

 
 Kemerovo Airport at Russian Airports Database
 World Aero Data airport information for UNEE
 Great Circle Mapper: KEJ / UNEE - Kemerovo, Kemerovo, Russian Federation (Russia)
 ASN Accident history for UNEE
 NOAA/NWS current weather observations
 Historical Weather Records for Kemerovo

Airports built in the Soviet Union
Airports in Kemerovo Oblast